Monaco-Matin is a daily newspaper in Monaco.

Overview
Monaco-Matin started as a supplement to Nice-Matin. In 1997, it became a separate newspaper after Rainier III, Prince of Monaco asked the media proprietor to establish it.

By 2005, its daily circulation was 8,000. By 2006, it grew to 8,300.

The headquarters of Monaco-Matin is in Monaco.

The paper is owned by Groupe Hersant Média. Its editor-in-chief is Hervé Mari.

It has five journalists based in Monaco. They cover the news, sports, economics, politics and culture, including Monegasque holidays.

See also
 List of newspapers in Monaco

References

Mass media in Monaco
French-language newspapers published in Europe